Lemooria is a genus of flowering plants in the family Asteraceae described as a genus in 1989.

There is only one known species, Lemooria burkittii, endemic to Australia. It is found in every state except Tasmania.

References

Gnaphalieae
Monotypic Asteraceae genera
Flora of Australia
Taxa named by Philip Sydney Short